Johan 'Hans' van de Ven (born 10 January 1958 in Velsen, Netherlands) is an authority on the history of 19th and 20th century China. He holds several positions at the University of Cambridge, where he is Professor of Modern Chinese History,  Director in Asian and Middle Eastern Studies at St Catharine's College and previously served as Chair of the Faculty of Asian and Middle Eastern Studies. He studied sinology at Leiden University. Then, after studying with Susan Naquin at the University of Pennsylvania for a period of time, he moved to Harvard University, where he studied modern Chinese history under Philip Kuhn and received his PhD.

Van de Ven has particularly focused on the history of the Chinese Communist Party, Chinese warfare, the Chinese Maritime Customs Service and the history of globalization in modern China.

Van de Ven is a guest professor at the History Department of Nanjing University and was an International Fellow at the Hopkins-Nanjing Center, China, in 2005–06. In 2019, he was appointed as an honorary visiting professor at the Institute of Humanities and Social Sciences at Peking University.

He was awarded the Philip Lilienthal Prize of the University of California Press for best first book in Asian Studies for his book on the founding of the Chinese Communist Party in 1991 and the Society for Military History 2012 Book Prize for non-US work for the book The Battle for China, which he edited along with Mark Peattie and Edward Drea.

Van de Ven is married to Susan Kerr. They have three sons - Johan, Derek and Willem. His  wife's father was the late Malcolm H. Kerr, political scientist and President of the American University of Beirut, who was assassinated in January 1984.  She wrote a book about her family's quest for truth and justice. Van de Ven is the brother-in-law of Steve Kerr, coach of the Golden State Warriors, former Arizona Wildcats and Chicago Bulls player.

Bibliography
As Author:
 China at War: Triumph and Tragedy in the Emergence of the New China 1937-1952. London: Profile Books. 2017.  Cambridge, MA: Harvard University Press. 2018. . 2017 pbk edition
 Breaking with the Past: The Maritime Customs Service and the Global Origins of Modernity in China. New York: Columbia University Press. 2014. .
 
 

As Editor:
 
 Negotiating China's Destiny in World War II. Stanford: Stanford University Press. 2014. .
 
 

Editor of Journal Special Issues:
 "Robert Hart and the Chinese Maritime Customs Service", special issue of Modern Asian Studies, vol. 40:3 (July 2006). Introduction (pp. 545–7) and ‘Robert Hart and Gustav Detring during the Boxer Rebellion’ (pp. 631–663) 2001
 "Lifting the Veil of Secrecy: Secret Services in China during World War II", Intelligence and National Security, 16:4 (Winter 2001), author of 'Introduction' (pp. 1–10) and 'The Kuomintang's Secret Service in Action in South China: Operational and Political Aspects of the Arrest of Liao Chengzhi (1942)', pp. 205–37 1996  
 "War in the Making of Modern China" Modern Asian Studies, vol.30:4. Author of 'Introduction' (pp. 737–56) and 'Public Finance and the Rise of Warlordism' (pp. 829–68)

References

External links
 Biography at the Faculty of Asian and Middle Eastern Studies, University of Cambridge, by Hans van de Ven
 Interviewed by Alan Macfarlane 17 May 2019 (video)

1958 births
Living people
Dutch orientalists
 
Dutch sinologists
Fellows of St Catharine's College, Cambridge
Harvard Graduate School of Arts and Sciences alumni
People from Velsen